Temeni is a village in the municipal unit of Aigio, Achaea, Greece.  Temeni had a population of 1,214 in 2011. It is situated between the river Selinountas and the Gulf of Corinth, 4 km southeast of Aigio town centre and 1 km west of Valimitika. The spring water Avra is manufactured near Temeni.

Population

See also
List of settlements in Achaea

References

External links
 Temeni on GTP Travel Pages

Aigialeia
Aigio
Populated places in Achaea